Mariusz Zganiacz (born August 31, 1984 in Wodzisław Śląski) is a Polish footballer (attacking midfielder) playing currently for ROW Rybnik.

Career
He is the former U-21 Poland national football team member.

External links
 

1984 births
Living people
Polish footballers
Legia Warsaw players
Odra Wodzisław Śląski players
Korona Kielce players
Odra Opole players
Piast Gliwice players
GKS Tychy players
People from Wodzisław Śląski
Sportspeople from Silesian Voivodeship
Association football midfielders